SM UB-26 was a German Type UB II submarine or U-boat in the German Imperial Navy during World War I. The U-boat was ordered on 30 April 1915 and launched on 14 December 1915. She was commissioned into the German Imperial Navy on 27 December 1915 as SM UB-26. She was raised by the French on 30 August 1917 and served as Roland Morillot.

On 23 October 1922, Roland Morillot sprang a leak and was abandoned in the English Channel west of Guernsey, Channel Islands. Her crew were rescued by the French ship Daphne. Roland Morillot was subsequently towed into Cherbourg, France by the French tug .

Roland Morillot was repaired and remained in service until 21 January 1925. She then was used in tests before finally being broken up in Cherbourg in 1935.

Design
A German Type UB II submarine, UB-26 had a displacement of  when at the surface and  while submerged. The submarine was powered by two Daimler six-cylinder diesel engines producing a total , two Siemens-Schuckert electric motors producing , and one propeller shaft.

UB-26 was fitted with two  torpedo tubes, four torpedoes, and one  SK L/40 deck gun. She had a complement of twenty-one crew members and two officers and a thirty-second dive time.

Notes

References

Bibliography 

 

1915 ships
Ships built in Bremen (state)
World War I submarines of Germany
German Type UB II submarines
U-boats commissioned in 1916
U-boats scuttled in 1916
Foreign submarines in French service
World War I submarines of France
Maritime incidents in 1916
Maritime incidents in 1922